is a Japanese manga series written and illustrated by Shuichi Shigeno. It was serialized in Kodansha's seinen manga magazine Weekly Young Magazine from March to October 2014.

Publication
Written and illustrated by Shuichi Shigeno, Takane no Hana was serialized in Kodansha's seinen manga magazine Weekly Young Magazine from March 10 to October 27, 2014. Kodansha collected its chapters in two tankōbon volumes, released on November 6 and December 5, 2014.

Volume list

References

Further reading

External links
 

Kodansha manga
Romance anime and manga
Seinen manga